Ferdynand is a Polish variant of the Germanic name Ferdinand. Ferdynand means "bold protector".

People named Ferdynand
Ferdynand is a given name. Notable people with the name include:

Ferdynand Antoni Ossendowski (1876–1945), Polish writer, journalist, traveller, explorer and university professor
Ferdynand Arczyński (1900–1979), founding member of Żegota in German-occupied Poland (1942–1945)
Ferdynand Radziwiłł (1834–1926), Polish nobleman and Polish-German politician
Ferdynand Ruszczyc (1870–1936), Polish painter, printmaker, and stage designer
Ferdynand Zarzycki (1888–1958), Polish general and politician
Karol Ferdynand Vasa (1613–1655), Prince-Bishop of Breslau/Wrocław, bishop of Płock and Duke of Oppeln Opole
Stanisław Ferdynand Rzewuski (1737–1786), Polish noble (szlachcic)

See also
Ferdinand